Schloss Gripsholm. Eine Sommergeschichte (Gripsholm palace: A summer story) is the title of a story (Erzählung) by Kurt Tucholsky, published in 1931. It is a love story with comic and melancholic elements, reminiscent of the author's first novel, Rheinsberg: Ein Bilderbuch für Verliebte.

Plot 

The book begins with a fictional correspondence of an author and his publisher, Ernst Rowohlt. with Rowohlt encouraging Tucholsky to write another light and cheerful love story, and Tucholsky replying that he could offer a summer story.

The following story covers a summer vacation of Kurt, called Peter and narrating in the first person, with his friend Lydia, called by him almost always "die Prinzessin" (the princess), in Sweden. After train and ferry rides, they arrive at Gripsholm palace where they spend around three weeks. They are visited there by Kurt's old friend Karlchen, and later Lydia's best friend Billie. The story in episodes includes an erotic scene of three, unusual at the end of Weimar Germany, but also the observation of a little girl suffering under a sadistic German woman running a children's home. They contact the child's mother who lives in Switzerland and organise the girl's trip back to there.

Background 

At first he emigrated to Paris, but in 1929 he decided to move to Sweden. He lived in  Läggesta, close to Gripsholm from April to October that year, but searched for a different permanent home. Tucholsky wrote in a letter to Alfred Stern that the book has only a few autobiographical features. Tucholsky was deprived of his German citizenship when the Nazis came to power. He died in 1935 and was buried close to Schloss Gripsholm.

Editions 
The story first appeared as a serial novel in Berliner Tageblatt, beginning on 20 March 1931. It was published as a book by Rowohlt Verlag in Berlin the same year. In 1950, the story was one of the first paperbacks by Rowohlt.

Film 
The story was filmed in 1963 for the first time, titled Schloß Gripsholm, directed by Kurt Hoffmann and starring Walter Giller, Jana Brejchová, Hanns Lothar and Nadja Tiller.

Another film, Gripsholm, was released in 2000, directed by Xavier Koller, starring Ulrich Noethen, Heike Makatsch and Jasmin Tabatabai.

References

Further reading 
 Kurt Tucholsky: Gesamtausgabe. Texte und Briefe. edited by Antje Bonitz, Dirk Grathoff, Michael Hepp, Gerhard Kraiker. 22 volumes. Reinbek 1996 ff., vol. 14: Texts 1931. edited by Sabina Becker, Rowohlt Verlag, Reinbek 1998, pp. 552–601, 
 Walter Delabar: Eine kleine Liebesgeschichte. Kurt Tucholskys "Schloß Gripsholm. Eine Sommergeschichte.", in: Sabina Becker,  Ute Maack (eds.): Kurt Tucholsky. Das literarische und publizistische Werk. Darmstadt 2002, pp. 115–142
 Kirsten Ewentraut: Auch hier geht es nicht ohne Freud. Tucholskys "Schloß Gripsholm" – Eine kleine Sommergeschichte? in: Michael Hepp, Roland Links (eds.): Schweden – das ist ja ein langes Land. Kurt Tucholsky und Schweden. Dokumentation der KTG-Tagung 1994. Oldenburg 1994, pp. 149–180.
 : Geschichte der deutschsprachigen Literatur 1918 bis 1933. C. H. Beck, Munich 2017, .

External links 

 
 Schloß Gripsholm DigBib.Org (Free digital library)
 
 
 Lüddemann, Stefan: "Sommergeschichten der Kultur" / Tucholskys "Schloss Gripsholm", Klassiker der Sommerliteratur  (in German) NOZ 3 July 2020

1931 German novels
Novels set in Södermanland